The Porter (May 15, 1915 – October 1944) was an American Thoroughbred racehorse. He won 26 times from 54 starts in a career that lasted five years, and was second in the 1918 Preakness Stakes. He became an important sire, leading the North American sire list in 1937.

Background
The Porter was a bay horse bred in Kentucky by David Stevenson. He was sired by Sweep, a champion at both age two and three on the racetrack, and a leading sire and broodmare sire at stud. His dam Ballet Girl was a half-sister to champion Ballot.

He was known for his soundness and ability to carry high weights.

At the start of his racing career, The Porter was owned by Samuel Ross. He was sold early in 1918 to E. B. McLean, who sent him into training with John Schorr.

Racing career
Racing mainly in Maryland and Kentucky, The Porter started 54 times, accumulating 26 wins, 10 seconds and 8 thirds. He was the fifth-ranked three-year old of 1918 according to The Blood-Horse. That year, he won the Blue and Grey Highweight Handicap and Baltimore Handicap, beating the highly regarded colts Omar Khayyam and Cudgel in the latter in what was called the "surprise of the season". He was also second in the Preakness Stakes. 

In 1919, he earned a reputation as one of the best handicap horses in "the West" (as racing in Kentucky was then known). He then traveled to Saratoga where he won the Plattsburgh Handicap. Returning to Maryland, he won The Harford Handicap, in which he defeated future Hall of Famer Exterminator, followed by a win over Triple Crown champion Sir Barton in the feature race on September 24 at Havre de Grace. He won a string of three handicap races at Laurel in October, before finishing second to Sir Barton in the Pimlico Serial.

In 1920, he was the third-ranked older horse (behind Sir Barton and Exterminator) according to the Blood-Horse after he won several major races. On May 24, He set a track record for seven furlongs of 1:25 at Churchill Downs, followed by a win in the Inaugural Handicap at Latonia on June 5. On September 11, he won the $5,000 Harford Handicap at Havre de Grace for the second time, beating Boniface by four lengths. Best known as a miler, The Porter won at a distance of nine furlongs in the $10,000 Havre de Grace Handicap while carrying 129 pounds compared to 108 pounds on the runner-up.
 
The highlight of his six-year-old campaign in 1921 was winning the Annapolis Handicap over Exterminator. Stretching out to  miles, well beyond his usual distance, he rated behind Exterminator then made his move with half a mile remaining.  Exterminator, carrying top weight of 135 pounds, could not respond and finished third. The Porter drew off to win by over two lengths.

During his career, he equaled or broke several track records at distances from 7 to  furlongs.

Stud career
The Porter initially stood at McLean's stud near Leesburg, Virginia. When McLean's stock was dispersed in 1931, The Porter was purchased for $27,000 by John Hay Whitney and was moved to Mare's Nest Stud near Lexington, Kentucky. He was pensioned after the 1943 season and died in October 1944.

The Porter was the leading sire in North America of 1937. His most important offspring include Aneroid, Porter's Cap, Porter's Mite, Rosemont and Toro. His daughter Two Bob was both a stakes winner and a multiple stakes producer. Two Bob's family remains active and has produced classic winners in the United States, Great Britain, Germany and Japan.

Pedigree

References

1915 racehorse births
1944 racehorse deaths
Racehorses bred in Kentucky
Racehorses trained in the United States
Thoroughbred family 14
Horse racing track record setters
United States Champion Thoroughbred Sires